Cochliomyia is a genus in the family Calliphoridae, known as blowflies, in the order Diptera. Cochliomyia is commonly referred to as the New World screwworm flies, as distinct from Old World screwworm flies. Four species are in this genus: C. macellaria, C. hominivorax, C. aldrichi, and C. minima. C. hominivorax is known as the primary screwworm because its larvae produce myiasis and feed on living tissue. This feeding causes deep, pocket-like lesions in the skin, which can be very damaging to the animal host. C. macellaria is known as the secondary screwworm because its larvae produce myiasis, but feed only on necrotic tissue. Both C. hominivorax and C. macellaria thrive in warm, tropical areas.

Characteristics

Adult 

In general, all Diptera have three body regions (head, thorax, and abdomen), three pairs of legs, one pair of forewings used for flight, one pair of halteres which are modified hindwings, and one pair of antennae.

New World screwworm flies share many characteristics of the common house fly. When keying out a dipteran specimen, it is important to first note whether bristles on the meron are present or absent. All species in the family Calliphoridae have bristles on their merones, plumose arista, and well-developed calypters. Both C. macellaria and C. hominivorax are metallic green to bluish green in major coloration, with setae on the dorsal surface of the stem vein, orange gena, pale white anterior spiracles, filiform palps, and three black longitudinal stripes (vittae) on the notum of the thorax. The species C. macellaria has pale setulae on the fronto-orbital plate outside the row of frontal bristles, while C. hominivorax has dark setulae on the fronto-orbital plate outside the row of frontal bristles. The female C. macellaria has a yellowish basicosta while the female C. hominivorax has a brown basicosta.

Larvae 
The larvae of both C. macellaria and C. hominivorax have cylindrical bodies tapering anteriorly with 10 or more robust spines around the spiracular area, incomplete peritremes, an indistinct or absent button, and bands of small spines on each segment. The C. hominivorax larvae have distinctly pigmented tracheal trunks. C. macellaria larvae do not have pigmented tracheal trunks; they have spines in a V shape on the anal protuberance and no oral sclerite.

Life cycle 
The general life cycle of Cochliomyia is similar to any other Diptera in that they are holometabolous. The four stages are egg, larva, pupa, and adult. This entire life cycle lasts an average of 21 days at prime conditions (preferably a warm, moist environment), and can last as long as three months in colder climates. Females only lay eggs once in a lifetime and can lay 100 to 400 in a clutch.  Females usually lay their eggs on the edge of an open wound. Warm and moist conditions are the perfect combination of home and food source. The nasal, oral, or anal areas of a host are especially prone to Cochliomyia oviposition.

Larvae hatch about 12–21 hours after the eggs have been laid. Larvae are cream colored. C. hominivorax larvae dive head-first into whatever food source is nearest, and burrow deeper, eating into live flesh if available. This results in a pocket-like lesion that causes severe pain to the host. C. macellaria larvae only feed on the necrotic tissue of a wound. After five to seven days, the larvae drop and move away from the food source to pupate. The larvae burrow into the first layer of topsoil, beneath leaves or garbage, and begin their pupation. The pupa is a dark brown color. This stage can last from seven days at a warm temperature to as long as two months if the weather is much colder. Adults emerge and spend a day or two finishing maturity. Adults of C. hominivorax breed only once in their lifetimes. Sexually mature adults breed 3–4 days after emerging from the pupa. Males mature rapidly, and spend their time waiting and eating nearby vegetation and the nectar of flowers. Females, however, are predatory, and feed on the fluids from live wounds. Females can fly long distances to find a mate. Adult flies of this species live around two to three weeks.

Cochliomyia hominivorax

Biology 
The primary screwworm, C. hominivorax, is a parasitic species, whose larvae are renowned for eating and infesting the flesh of living organisms, primarily warm-blooded animals such as cattle and other livestock. Their larvae cause myiasis ("flystrike"), an infestation of maggots in lesions or other wounds and injuries that the host animal may have. Flystrike may occur due to such farming processes as branding, castrating, dehorning, and tailing of the host animals. These processes, along with barbed-wire cuts and flea bites, lead to myiasis in the host animal. Navels of newborns also can be the sites of infestation. C. hominivorax tends to reproduce only on the flesh of a living host. Unlike most other maggots, these maggots attack and consume healthy living tissue along with decaying tissue (hominivorax literally translates to “man-eating”). The larvae are responsible for their common name, the screwworm, because they possess small spines on each body segment that resemble a screw's threads. After the larvae hatch, they dive into the wound and burrow deeper, perpendicular to the skin surface, eating into live flesh, again resembling a screw being driven into an object. The larvae then continue to feed on the wound fluids and the animal's tissue.

Elimination programs 

The sterile insect technique was proposed by scientists Edward F. Knipling and Raymond C. Bushland, and was rapidly adopted by the United States Department of Agriculture in 1958. The technique centers on a unique reproductive handicap that prevents female C. hominivorax flies from mating more than once. The scientists reasoned that if it were possible to clinically sterilize and release huge numbers of males as breeding time approached, fertile males might be outcompeted and the majority of female flies would lay sterile eggs. Irradiating the males was used for sterilization.

Because the agricultural industry was losing millions of dollars annually due to treatment and loss of fly-struck animals, this solution was quickly approved for testing. It was first applied on a large scale in Florida in the 1950s, due both to the severity of the problem there and to the state's unique island-mimicking geography, which allowed for relative isolation of the Florida C. hominivorax population. The eradication of Florida's primary screwworm population was completed in 1959. The program was then applied throughout the southern United States, and eventually adopted through much of Mexico in 1972 and parts of Central and South America. The primary screwworm was completely eradicated from the southern United States in 1966 and from Mexico in 1991. Livestock there continue to be vulnerable, however, and strict laws regarding animal inspection and reporting of suspected infestations remain in place.

A new screwworm infestation in the Florida Keys was first reported in October, 2016, which was mostly in the key deer population, along with five confirmed infestations in domestic animals. In response, the USDA released over 80 million sterile flies from 25 ground release sites on twelve islands and the city of Marathon.

The first, and to-date largest, documented infestation of C. hominivorax myiasis outside of the Americas occurred in North Africa from 1989 to 1991. The outbreak was traced to a herd of sheep in Libya's Tripoli region, which began suffering screwworm attacks in July 1989; over the following months, the myiasis spread rapidly, infecting numerous herds across a 25,000 km2 area.  Eventually, the infested region spanned from the Mediterranean coast to the Sahara Desert, threatening the more than 2.7 million animals susceptible to C. hominivorax that inhabited the area.  More than 14,000 cases of large-scale myiasis due to the C. hominivorax species were documented. Traditional control methods using veterinary assessment and treatment of individual animals were insufficient to contain the widely dispersed outbreak, so the United Nations Food and Agriculture Organization launched a program based on the sterile insect technique. About 1.26 billion sterile flies were produced in Mexico, shipped to the infested area, and released to mate with their wild counterparts. Within months, the C. hominivorax population collapsed; by April 1991, the program had succeeded in eradicating C. hominivorax in the Eastern Hemisphere. This effort, which cost under US$100 million, was among the most efficient and successful international animal health programs in UN history.

The North African outbreak both provided proof of the sterile male technique's efficacy and led to numerous enhancements in its implementation; after 1991, it entered into use across parts of Central and South America. However, the inaccessibility of some areas that the fly inhabits, language differences, and the need of constant vigilance have slowed the eradication of this species.

Current research
Research is currently being performed to develop a synthetic odor bait to replace the use of wounded animals as bait for the females of C. hominivorax. This previously used method has fallen out of favor. The synthetic bait is formulated to mimic natural wound fluid from animals. The female flies are attracted to animal wounds to obtain a protein meal and to oviposit. The synthetic bait could be used at research stations that monitor for flies in regions where they are eradicated and to help decrease the screwworm populations in infested regions.

Cochliomyia macellaria

General information
The secondary screwworm, C. macellaria, is a flesh-eating fly whose larvae consume only necrotic tissue, either that of carrion or of an animal or human host (myiasis). This important distinction between C. macellaria and C. hominivorax was not understood for much of medical history; myiasis of humans and animals was viewed as universally disastrous. However, as medical understanding of the process of tissue breakdown and infection progressed, it began to be observed that wounds with specific types of maggot infestation actually had a decreased severity and duration of infection. This progressed to the point where C. macellaria larvae were being applied in some cases as surgical maggots. However, the negative connotation surrounding the word “screwworm” has persisted, and the largely harmless secondary screwworms are often blamed for myiasitic attacks for which primary screwworms are actually responsible.  This should not be interpreted to mean that C. macellaria is not an avid consumer of flesh; it is routinely among the first colonisers of carrion, and in forensic cases has long had a habit of literally consuming evidence. Secondary screwworms are especially abundant on corpses and carrion in warm, direct sunlit areas. Fortunately, with the recent advent of molecular evidence, C. macellaria maggots removed from a body and boiled to sterility can now provide vital information regarding a victim and determining a post mortem interval. Forensic entomologists can use various extraction methods to test the composition of the alimentary canal of the larvae to determine if victims had any drugs or mind-altering substances in their systems before they were killed. It is important, though, for forensic entomologists to determine whether the Old World screwworm, Chrysomya rufifacies, is present in the maggot masses on the body, because C. rufifacies is usually after C. macellaria in the succession of colonising a body and C. rufifacies second- and third-instar larvae are facultatively predatory. This could result in a post mortem interval being off by a few days at the most if the C. rufifacies were to prey upon all of the C. macellaria larvae.

Secondary screwworms have the stereotypical metallic green body of the genus, and the larvae are extremely similar to those of C. hominivorax. The most effective way to differentiate the two is to note the absence on C. macellaria of the distinctive pigmented tracheal tubes, as well as the presence of a V-shaped pattern of spines on the anal protuberance, and the lack of an oral sclerite.

History
Interaction between humans and C. macellaria outside of accidental secondary myiasis has been largely unremarkable, with the notable exception of their early use in surgical maggot therapy. However, given the medical stigma surrounding the screwworm fly, and the slight potential for even C. macellaria to secondarily infest tissue beyond the desired extent of medical use, it has currently fallen out of favor with the medical community, which prefers the predictable Lucilia sericata. Nonetheless, C. macellaria has been and remains a concern for farmers, veterinarians, and public health officials.

Human management 

Primary screwworms are primary, obligate parasites in the larval stage, and as a result are capable, unlike secondary screwworms, of initialising the penetration of the skin barrier to create an entry wound. Despite this, they are most commonly seen as colonisers of previously existing wounds, and frequently are hatched from eggs laid at the perimeter of a wound. Once the infestation commences, a dark brown or reddish-brown discharge begins leaking from the wound, sometimes accompanied by an unpleasant smell as the flesh begins to decay. This is often the first sign in both livestock and human victims that something is amiss, and often initiates consultation with a professional. As the infestation increases, the victim begins to experience escalating tissue irritation, and in the case of domesticated animals, may be observed to become withdrawn, listless, and anorexic.

Once the process of clinical diagnosis begins and myiasis is recognised, the larvae are fairly easy to identify. Their overall body structure resembles the spiraled screw shape on which their common name is based, a shape fairly unusual within parasitic larvae. The cranial end of the larvae has two sharply curved hooks, generally dark in color, and distinctive spiracle patterns are observed at the caudal end. The most identifying features, and the easiest way to differentiate between C. hominivorax and C. macellaria, are the prominent darkened tracheal tubes which are visible in the final third of the larval body of the former, and are often visible both with a microscope and to the naked eye.

Treatment of the victim can be time-consuming and, due to the high incidence of secondary infection, frustrating, but with decisive treatment, a surprisingly positive result is often achieved in all but the worst cases. The obvious first step is the manual removal of the maggots, generally using tweezers or forceps to seize the larva at the posterior end as the spiracles emerge to allow respiration.  Once all larvae have been removed, a topical antibiotic smear is applied, often with an oral antibiotic accompaniment. Necrotic tissue may need to be debrided, which can be a painful process. A loose dressing is essential to allow continued fluid drainage from the wound.

As with many things, prevention is the best cure. Any open wound, even one so small as a blister, is a potential infestation site, and should be treated accordingly with approved pesticides. At times of the year when livestock are most vulnerable (castration, birthing, etc.), daily inspections should be conducted when possible. Infestations detected early are quite treatable, but fatalities can and do result from advanced infestation, particularly in sheep and newborn calves.

Secondary screwworms appear only around an existing wound (wound in this case being defined as including the opened cord area of newborn livestock), so practice facultative myiasis. They are attracted most strongly to infected wounds due to the strong odor of the wound's discharge, but even a small blister or abrasion can serve as an infestation site. Flies can also be induced to lay their eggs in hair or wool that is matted thickly and stained with any bodily fluid.

As with C. hominivorax, the first sign of an infestation is often the irritated surface of the wound, producing many of the same symptoms. The larvae can be diagnosed and identified by a trained professional based on larval size, shape (again following the spiraled screw-shape), and ultimately on spiracle pattern. These larvae lack the distinctive pigmented tracheal tubes that mark C. hominivorax.

As the secondary screwworm does not have the biological characteristic of single lifetime breeding as does C. hominivorax, no widespread control methods are currently in place beyond the usual pesticide spraying done for general fly control. However, due to its being associated with facultative myiasis, its impact on livestock in the United States is not nearly as severe. It can also be associated with human infestation in poorly run medical facilities and areas stricken by poverty, so vigilance is essential.

Distribution 
Both species thrive in tropical areas which are warm and humid. C. macellaria is the most common species of the two in North America, distributed throughout northern South America, Central America, Caribbean Islands, the United States, and southern Canada.

C. hominivorax was distributed throughout the northern South America, Central America, Caribbean Islands, and the United States prior to the use of the sterile insect technique, after which it was eliminated from the U.S. and Mexico. However, the bordering Central American countries serve a challenge to keep the species eliminated since these countries still have populations of this fly. Many of these countries continue to implement elimination programs.

References

Further reading
 Hall, David G.. The Blowflies of North America. 1948.
 Curran, John. Veterinary Officer, Broome (2002). Screw-Worm Fly. Government of Western Australia: Department of Agriculture Farmnotes. Retrieved on March 18, 2008.
 "blow fly." Encyclopædia Britannica. 2008. Encyclopædia Britannica Online. Retrieved March 19, 2008.
 Animal Health Officer (in. "The New World Screwworm in Mexico and Central America." FAO.Com. 1991. Retrieve March 19, 2008.
"America's Never-Ending Battle Against Flesh-Eating Worms", by Sarah Zhang, The Atlantic, May 2020.

External links
Identification of Calliphoridae Species
Screwworm General Information
New World Screwworm Mapping, United States Department of Agriculture, Animal and Plant Health Inspection Service
secondary screwworm Cochliomyia macellaria on the UF / IFAS Featured Creatures Web site
Species Profile - Screwworm (Cochliomyia), National Invasive Species Information Center, United States National Agricultural Library.  Lists general information and resources for Screwworm.
USDA Screwworm Eradication Program Records, USDA National Agricultural Library.  The library has a large collection related to Screwworm eradication including personal papers of individuals involved in the program, geographically specific records, oral histories, and artifacts.
STOP Screwworms: Selections from the Screwworm Eradication Collection, USDA National Agricultural Library online exhibit

Calliphoridae
Diptera of North America
Oestroidea genera
Taxa named by Charles Henry Tyler Townsend
Insects in culture